The national road SH1 is a national highway in Albania.

As part of the European routes E762 and E851, the highway constitute portion of a larger corridor connecting Montenegro in the northwest with Tirana in the southwest thus forming as well as part of the Adriatic-Ionian motorway.
  
In recent years, the road has been undergoing major reconstruction works in several parts.

Route 

Tha National Road SH1 leads to the Albanian-Montenegrin border at Hani i Hotit border crossing. From Tirana at the Kamza Bypass (Albanian: Mbikalimi i Kamzës) northward, it passes through Fushë-Krujë, Milot, Lezhë, Shkodër, and Koplik. Between Thumane and Milot, the SH1 became part of A1 Motorway.

Background 

The road segment between Han i Hotit and Shkodër (about ) was completed in 2013 as a single carriageway standard (Albanian: superstradë). 
The Shkodër Bypass started after the 2010 floods. It was planned to incorporate a defensive dam against Lake Shkodër, but works were abandoned a few years later only to restart in 2017. The road continues as a single carriageway down to Milot and contains some uncontrolled and dangerous entry and exit points.

It is planned that sections between Milot and Lezhë will be widened to dual carriageway standard in the near future.

When it was designed in early 2000s, the entire road between Tirana and Shkodër was intended to be a dual carriageway. However, the lack of funding at the time only allowed for one carriageway to be constructed, thus the lack of shoulders. The section between Milot and Fushë-Krujë was unofficially named as the "Road of Death" by many media reports for its structural deficiencies. As of 2009, the  dangerous long section is being upgraded to motorway standard and has become part of the A1 motorway connecting the capital Tirana with Kosovo.

See also 
 Transport in Albania
 A1 (Albania)
 Adriatic Ionian motorway

References

External links 

SH01 (Albania)
Transport in Durrës County
Transport in Lezhë County
Transport in Shkodër County
Transport in Tirana County